Tapi Riverfront is a waterfront being developed along the banks of Tapi River in Surat, India. State Government had cleared  54 hectares land on riverbanks for development of riverfront project

Geography

See also 

List of tourist attractions in Surat
Weir-cum Causeway
Cable Bridge Surat

References 

Tourist attractions in Surat
Redeveloped ports and waterfronts in India
Proposed infrastructure in Gujarat